Raw Force (also known as Kung Fu Cannibals) is a 1982  Filipino-American martial arts action-horror film written and directed  by Edward D. Murphy and starring  Cameron Mitchell.

Plot   

The Burbank Karate club travel to a forbidden island of disgraced martial artists to do battle with Zombies, mercenaries, cannibals and Kung Fu masters so deadly and sinister they had to be banished to the Island of Raw Force.

Cast 
  
 Cameron Mitchell as Captain Harry Dodds 
  Geoffrey Binney   as Mike O'Malley 
 Hope Holiday  as  Hazel Buck 
 Jillian Kesner  as  Cookie Winchell 
 John Dresden  as  John Taylor 
 Jennifer Holmes  as Ann Davis 
 Rey King  as  Go Chin 
 Carla Reynolds as   Eilleen Fox 
 Carl Anthony as   Lloyd Davis
 Jewel Shepard as Drunk Sexpot 
 Vic Díaz  as  Monk
 Camille Keaton as Girl in Toilet

Legacy   
Raw Force inspired the song "Burbank Karate Club" by Das Binky & Jordan Hirsch, released in 2021.

See also   
 List of martial arts films

References

External links 

1980s action horror films
1982 martial arts films
1982 films
1982 horror films
Philippine martial arts films
Philippine action horror films
American zombie films
American martial arts films
American action films
Films about cannibalism
Films scored by Walter Murphy
1980s English-language films
1980s American films